Patricia Fargnoli (November 16, 1937 – February 18, 2021) was an American poet and psychotherapist. She was the New Hampshire Poet Laureate from December 2006 to March 2009.

Biography
Fargnoli was an alumna of Trinity College, Hartford College for Women, and the University of Connecticut School of Social Work.

Fargnoli's books of poetry include Necessary Light (Utah State University Press, 1999), winner of the May Swenson Book Award; Lives of Others (Oyster River Press, 2001); Small Songs of Pain (Pecan Grove Press, 2003); Duties of the Spirit (Tupelo Press, 2005) which won the Jane Kenyon Literary Award for Outstanding Poetry by a New Hampshire poet; and, most recently, Then, Something (also from Tupelo Press, 2009), which won the 2009 Foreword Review Best of the Year Silver Award in Poetry.

She was the recipient of a fellowship from the MacDowell Colony. Her poems appeared in magazines and literary journals including Poetry, Ploughshares, Prairie Schooner, The Indiana Review, Mid-American Review, and Nimrod.

She served as an Associate Editor of The Worcester Review, and taught at The Frost Place, the NH Institute of Art and in the Lifelong Learning Program at Keene State College.

A resident of Walpole, New Hampshire, she was a member of the New Hampshire Arts Council Touring Roster and of the New Hampshire Writers' Project at Southern New Hampshire University.

She had three children: Kenneth, Michael, and Diana; and four grandchildren: Alycia, Joseph Fargnoli, Joshua, and Jessica.

References

Sources
 Interview: Emprise Review > Dormeuse in Alice in Wonderland: Dialogue with Fiona Sze-Lorrain/Greta Aart > November 2008
 Author's official website: bio

External links
 Video: New Hampshire Public Television > NH Poet Laureate: Patricia Fargnoli > Aired Wednesday, Feb 22, 2006
 Poets & Writers Directory of Writers > Patricia Fargnoli
 Interview: Portsmouth Herald Accent > Fargnoli named as state's poet laureate > By Michael Blinn 
 NH Writers' Project - Kearsarge Festival Poets & Presenters
 Review: Web Del Sol Review of Books > A Note on Patricia Fargnoli's Work > by Ilya Kaminsky
 Tupelo Press > Author Page > Patricia Fargnoli
 "The Undeniable Pressure of Existence" featured on The Writer's Almanac

Poets from New Hampshire
Living people
Trinity College (Connecticut) alumni
University of Hartford alumni
University of Connecticut alumni
Poets Laureate of New Hampshire
People from Walpole, New Hampshire
American women poets
20th-century American poets
20th-century American women writers
21st-century American poets
21st-century American women writers
1937 births